Zimonjić is a Serbian surname. It may refer to:

Bogdan Zimonjić (1813–1909), Serbian priest and vojvoda
Nenad Zimonjić (born 1976), Serbian tennis player
Predrag Zimonjić (born 1970), Serbian water polo player
Petar Zimonjić (1866–1941), Serbian Orthodox bishop
Petronije Zimonjić (1942–2021), Serbian basketball strength and conditioning coach
Saša Zimonjić (born 1978), Serbian professional footballer

See also
Vojvoda Zimonić, village in Serbia

Serbian surnames